Ross House is a five-storey community-owned and managed heritage building in Flinders Lane, Melbourne. 

Ross House provides affordable and central access to office space, resources and meeting spaces as well as networks and shared experiences; allowing organisations to realise their potential. These services are offered to self-help and small community groups committed to social justice and environmental sustainability.

Ross House is a place for community groups to grow, connect and evolve.

Ross House Tenants
Tenancy at Ross House is open to small, independent, not for profit groups working towards a socially just and sustainable society. Criteria considered during tenancy application includes how the organisation:

 supports the need to remove disadvantage
 believes in advocacy, information sharing and co-operative methods
 is committed to self-help
 encourages participation in shared decision making
 supports the aims of Ross House
 is not for profit, non-government, and not a religious body or political party
 is small with less than 10 full-time staff

Ross House also accepts tenancy inquiries from small for profit businesses that are working towards the aims of community development and a sustainable society. These for profit businesses will only be considered when there are no not for profit groups waiting for tenancy.
Since its inception Ross House has nurtured over 300 organisations and is currently home to over 50 groups. The types of groups operating within Ross House include environmental organisations, social activist groups, self-advocacy groups, disability groups, and multi-cultural groups.

Past tenants have included:

 The Wilderness Society
 The International Women’s Development Agency (IWDA)
 JOY 94.9
 The Melbourne branch of The World Wildlife Fund for Nature (WWF)
 Environment Victoria

Structure
Ross House is community managed by the Ross House Association. The Ross House Association is made up of members (tenants and non tenants) and is governed via a collaborative approach.

Strategic decisions are made by The Committee which is made up of tenant members and non-tenant members. The Committee requisites demand that at least three of the elected committee members come from organisations made up of people that undergo some form of disadvantage or discrimination.

Ross House Association Members
Ross House membership is open to small, independent, non-profit organisations working towards social justice and environmental sustainability.

Members have the opportunity to contribute to the further development of the Ross House project by voting at the Annual General Meeting, being part of the Committee, or being on a sub-committee.

Individuals working towards the same aims as Ross House are also encouraged to become a supporter of the organisation.

History
The Collective of Self Help Groups was formed in the late 1970s, and in 1980 held a seminar, organised by Jenny Florence, then working for the Victorian Council of Social Services (VCOSS). This drew attention to the recurrent need for independent community and advocacy groups to have reliable and central access to vital resources such as affordable office and meeting space and office equipment.

Around the same time as the seminar, the R.E. Ross Trust approached VCOSS with a major donation, looking to invest in a project that would provide sustainable support for community groups in Victoria.

This need and this resource merged, and the community driven Ross House project was born: the purchase of a building to provide resources for self-help and community groups in Melbourne.

The Ross House model was inspired by two international examples of community managed buildings in Poland Street, London and Meringhof in Berlin, both of which now no longer exist.

In April 1985, the historic Royston House in Flinders Lane was purchased. Following extensive renovations funded by the State Government, grants from philanthropic trusts and corporate donations, and renamed Ross House, it was opened in 1987.

It is a unique project as it is the only community owned and managed non-profit resource in Australia.

Ross House building
Ross House was originally built as the Sargood Warehouse in 1898–1900, for Melbourne softgood importer Sir Frederick Thomas Sargood, whose company name at the time was Sargood, Butler, Nichol and Ewen. Frederick Sargood was a wealthy man, and is known for building the extensive house and garden, the Rippon Lea Estate in Elsternwick.

The building occupied a site that was created by the great fire of November in 1897 which destroyed most of city block.

Architects Sulman & Power of Sydney design is significant as an early example in Victoria of the influence of the American Romanesque style, as developed by Henry Hobson Richardson in America. The massive tall red-brick arches are contrasted by the delicacy of the metal oriel windows within, topped by a wide overhanging cornice.

Ross House also shows early design responses to the need for fire prevention in multi-storey buildings, such as the sprinkler system and fireproof doors. The recessing of the oriel windows was a fire-prevention measure adopted from England.

Ross House is historically significant as evidence of the large commercial warehouses that once occupied the city around Princes Bridge, Flinders Street and Flinders Lane at the turn of the twentieth century.

It was originally twice the size, extending from Flinders Lane right through to Flinders Street. The Flinders Street facing half was demolished in the early 1930s and replaced by the new headquarters for the State Electricity Commission.  

Later known as Royston House, it is heritage-listed with the National Trust (Victoria), and by Heritage Victoria.

References

Sources
Ross House Association, www.rosshouse.org.au
The National Trust of Australia (Victoria)
Higginson, Jo. Building for a community: the story of Ross House, Ross House Association, Melbourne, 1998.
Victorian Heritage Database

Organisations based in Melbourne